"Moonshine Lullaby" is a song from the 1946 musical Annie Get Your Gun, by Irving Berlin. It was first performed by Ethel Merman.  Other singers to have recorded the song include Bernadette Peters in 1999, Doris Day, and Mary Martin in 1957.  The song itself is considered a lullaby, but the lyrics are about a still where moonshine is brewed illegally.

Lyrics
Annie: 
Behind the hill
There's a busy little still
Where your Pappy's workin' in the moonlight

Your lovin' paw
Isn't quite within the law
So he's hidin' there behind the hill

Bye bye baby
Stop your '
Don't cry baby
Day will be dawning

And when it does
From the mountain where he wuz
He'll be coming with jug of moonshine

So count your sheep
Mama's singing you to sleep
With the Moonshine Lullaby

Trio: Loo Loo
Behind the hill
There's a busy little still
Where your Pappy's workin' in the moonlight

Your lovin' paw
Isn't quite within the law
So he's hidin' there behind the hill

Annie and Trio: 
Bye bye baby
Stop your '
Don't cry baby
Day will be dawning

Trio:
And when it does
From the mountain where he wuz
He'll be coming with jug of moonshine

Annie: 
So count your sheep
Mama's singing you to sleep
With the Moonshine Lullaby

Kids: 
Dream of Pappy
Very happy
With his jug of mountain rye

Annie: 
So count your sheep
Mama's singing you to sleep
With the Moonshine Lullaby

References

Songs from Annie Get Your Gun
Songs written by Irving Berlin
1946 songs